Mowmen Zamin (also Romanized as Mow‘men Zamīn; also known as Mo’men Zamīn, Moomazi, Mūmazī, and Mumiza) is a village in Shuil Rural District, Rahimabad District, Rudsar County, Gilan Province, Iran. At the 2006 census, its population was 37, in 15 families.

References 

Populated places in Rudsar County